Längelmävesi is a lake in southwestern Finland. Längelmävesi is within the municipalities of Jämsä (formerly Längelmäki), Kangasala (formerly Sahalahti), Kuhmalahti, and Orivesi.

Geography
Längelmävesi lake is part of the Kokemäenjoki drainage basin (watershed). It is one of a chain of lakes (Längelmäveden reitti) that includes Längelmävesi, Vesijärvi, Roine, Pälkänevesi, and Mallasvesi lakes. This chain of lakes drains into the Vanajavesi in Valkeakoski.

From the southeast, another chain of lakes (Hauhon reitti), consisting of Lummene, Kuohijärvi, Kukkia, Iso-Roine, Hauhonselkä, and Ilmoilanselkä lakes joins into the Vanajavesi.

In Finnish the former chain of lakes is called Längelmäveden reitti and the latter Hauhon reitti as it runs through the former municipality of Hauho.

In culture
In Finnish culture Längelmävesi and Roine lakes are well known — as they are mentioned in the famous poem "En sommardag i Kangasala" by Zachris Topelius and have thus became part of Finnish national landscape imagery.

See also
 List of lakes in Finland

References

External links
 

Kokemäenjoki basin
Landforms of Pirkanmaa
Lakes of Kangasala